The 2017 Silverstone GP3 Series round was the third round of the 2017 GP3 Series. It was held on 15 and 16 July 2017 at Silverstone Circuit in Silverstone, United Kingdom. The race supported the 2017 British Grand Prix.

Classification

Qualifying 

 Dorian Boccolacci been given a three-place grid penalty in for crashing over the rear of Alessio Lorandi at the end of race two in Austria.

Feature race

Sprint race

Championship standings after the round

Drivers' Championship standings

Teams' Championship standings

 Note: Only the top five positions are included for both sets of standings.

References

|- style="text-align:center"
|width="35%"|Previous race:
|width="30%"|GP3 Series2017 season
|width="40%"|Next race:

Silverstone
GP3
GP3 Silverstone